Sharon Slann (born 12 February 1966 in Clare, South Australia) is a wheelchair basketball player from Australia.  She was part of the silver medal-winning Australia women's national wheelchair basketball team at the 2000 Summer Paralympics. She was a member of the Australia team at the 1992 Barcelona Games and 1996 Athens Games. Her classification was 3.0 points at Atlanta and 2.5 points at Sydney Games.

References

Paralympic wheelchair basketball players of Australia
Paralympic silver medalists for Australia
Wheelchair category Paralympic competitors
Wheelchair basketball players at the 1992 Summer Paralympics
Wheelchair basketball players at the 1996 Summer Paralympics
Wheelchair basketball players at the 2000 Summer Paralympics
1966 births
Living people
Medalists at the 2000 Summer Paralympics
Paralympic medalists in wheelchair basketball